Philip Julian Klass (November 8, 1919 – August 9, 2005) was an American journalist, and UFO researcher, known for his skepticism regarding UFOs.  In the ufological and skeptical communities, Klass inspires polarized appraisals. He has been called the "Sherlock Holmes of UFOlogy".  Klass demonstrated "the crusader's zeal for what seems 'right,' regardless of whether it brings popular acclaim," a trait he claimed his father instilled in him.  "I've found," said Klass, "that roughly 97, 98 percent of the people who report seeing UFOs are fundamentally intelligent, honest people who have seen something—usually at night, in darkness—that is unfamiliar, that they cannot explain."  The rest, he said, were frauds.

Longtime ufologist James W. Moseley illustrated the ambivalence many UFO researchers feel about Klass. On the one hand, Moseley argued that Klass was sincere in his motives and that his work ultimately benefited the field of Ufology. In his memoirs, Moseley contended that, when pressed, most leading ufologists would admit that Klass knew the subject and the people involved and was welcomed, or at least pleasantly tolerated, at UFO meetings. However, Moseley also wrote that he and Klass "have had and continue to have intense doctrinal and factual disagreements, and there are things about Phil's 'style', like his attack on James E. McDonald, that I do not admire or agree with."  In a 1999 interview, fellow debunker Gary Posner wrote that despite some recent health problems, the 80-year-old "Klass's mind—and pen—remain razor sharp, to the delight of his grateful followers and to the constant vexation (or worse) of his legions of detractors."

Personal life
Klass was born November 8, 1919, in Des Moines, Iowa, to Raymond Klass and Anne Traxler, and grew up in Cedar Rapids, Iowa. His father was a lawyer recognized throughout the United States as an expert on automobile negligence law. As a Boy Scout he won a ride in an autogyro (an early helicopter) at the Iowa State Fair, and his younger sister, Rosanne Klass, also recalled that he spent a lot of time building crystal radios. He graduated from Iowa State College in 1941 with a Bachelor of Science degree in electrical engineering.

Klass moved from the Midwest to Washington, D.C., when he went to work for Aviation Week.  Between maintaining his journalistic responsibilities and keeping up with claims from the UFO community, Klass spent much of his adult life as a loner and workaholic.  He married at age 60.  His wife, Nadya, was six years his junior and worked for the Bulgaria service of Voice of America.  They had no children of their own, but Nadya had a son who escaped with her from communist Bulgaria in 1973.

Career

Editor, Aviation Week and Space Technology
For ten years, Klass worked for General Electric as an engineer in aviation electronics. Dissatisfied with his job, in 1952 he moved to Washington, DC, and joined Aviation Week, which later became Aviation Week & Space Technology. He was a senior editor of Aviation Week & Space Technology for thirty-four years.

Always striving to stay on the cutting edge, Klass published an "Exclusive Report on Counter Measures" in the November 18 and 25, 1957, editions of Aviation Week.  This report was referred to the FBI for the "unauthorized disclosure of information classified 'Secret'".  An investigation into the disclosure was dropped when the US Air Force told the FBI that the disclosed information could not be declassified for purposes of prosecution.

Klass wrote some of the first articles on inertial guidance systems, infrared missile guidance, and microelectronics. 

Declassified National Reconnaissance Office documents including a history of the Hexagon Project illustrate Klass's impact on the aerospace industry:    His book Secret Sentries in Space (1971) was one of the first books about spy-satellite technology.

In 1973 Klass was named a fellow of the Institute of Electrical and Electronics Engineers. He also was a member of the American Association for the Advancement of Science, the now-defunct Aviation/Space Writers Association, the National Press Club, and the National Aviation Club. Asteroid 7277 (1983 RM2) was named "Klass" after him. He received the Lauren D. Lyman Award in 1989 from the Aviation/Space Writers Association for distinguished career-long achievements, and the Boeing Decade of Excellence Award for lifetime achievement in 1998 from the Royal Aeronautical Society.

Retiring in 1986 as senior avionics editor of Aviation Week & Space Technology, he continued to contribute to the magazine for several more years.

UFO research
Klass's involvement in the UFO field can be traced to his reading of journalist John G. Fuller's Incident at Exeter (1966), about a series of UFO sightings in and around Exeter, New Hampshire. Noting that many of the Exeter UFO incidents took place close to high-power electric lines, Klass suspected that the UFO reports were best explained as a previously unknown type of plasma or ball lightning that might have been generated from the power lines or their transformers. A plasma, thought Klass, could be consistent with many UFO reports of bright lights moving erratically; a highly charged plasma might further explain the reported effects of UFOs on the electrical systems of airplanes and automobiles.  Klass wrote up his theory in a review of Fuller's book which was published in Aviation Week.  This was followed by another skeptical review of work by the National Investigations Committee on Aerial Phenomena (NICAP).  These articles garnered Klass tremendous attention within the UFO community, and, as Howard Blum put it, "... as if overnight, he had been christened by both friends and foes 'the country's leading UFO debunker'".

Klass initially applied his ball lightning theory cautiously and selectively in a series of magazine articles. He and physicist James E. McDonald exchanged cordial letters on the subject, and McDonald agreed that some UFOs might be a type of ball lighting. However, in his first book on the subject, Klass argued that plasmas could explain most or all UFOs, even cases of alleged alien abduction.

Klass's plasma hypothesis was not well received by those on either side of the UFO debate, who noted that Klass was using one unverified phenomenon, his hypothetical plasmas, to explain another unverified phenomenon, UFOs.  The two engaged in a bitter, months-long debate, leveling a variety of charges and accusations at one another. Eventually, Klass wrote to McDonald's superiors at the U.S. Navy (McDonald was formally retired from the Navy, but often worked with the Office of Naval Research), questioning how McDonald could spend so much time on UFO research and still fulfill the requirements for his atmospheric research grant. This did not result in McDonald losing ONR funding but did draw some criticism of Klass from members of the UFO community.

Criticism was also expressed by a more skeptical team of plasma experts assembled by the Condon Committee, all of whom rejected Klass's plasma theory as unscientific. Since that time, theories evoking similar phenomena with widely differing modes of generation have been proposed by commentators such as Michael Persinger, Terence Meaden, Albert Budden, and Paul Devereux. In 1999 the MoD Project Condign report proposed that "Unidentified Aerial Phenomena" (UAPs) comparable to the plasmas originally advocated by Klass (but as amended by Devereux and Randles) may represent a viable explanation for some UFO events. Therefore, while his original concept was discredited, it has been adapted by others, and in this regard Klass is regarded as a pioneer of this approach.

In the late 1960s, Klass quietly abandoned his plasma theory and afterwards argued that all UFO sightings could be explained as misidentification of normal phenomena (such as clouds, stars, comets, or airplanes) and/or as hoaxes. Jerome Clark contends that Klass argued in favor of hoaxes more than almost any other UFO skeptic, but that Klass rarely had evidence in favor of his accusations; this position was echoed by Don Ecker, who asserted that during a 1992 debate, Klass made unsubstantiated charges of "drug smuggling" against Australian pilot Frederick Valentich, who disappeared in 1978 after claiming a strange UFO was flying near his airplane.

Klass was a founding fellow of the Committee for the Scientific Investigation of Claims of the Paranormal (CSICOP, now the Committee for Skeptical Inquiry (CSI)) and served on its executive council and UFO subcommittee.  He conducted a number of skeptic-centered reports on UFOs and UFO sightings. He published the bimonthly Skeptics UFO Newsletter for several years and wrote several books on the subject (see below).

In the 1970s, Klass heaped praise on astronomer and UFO investigator Allan Hendry's The UFO Handbook, but Hendry objected strongly to Klass's modus operandi, which Hendry argued consisted of suppressing and distorting evidence, unscientific reasoning, ad hominem attacks, smear campaigns, scientific bait and switch tactics, and seemingly refusing to evaluate evidence that conflicted with his preconceptions. Nuclear physicist and UFO researcher Stanton T. Friedman also frequently jousted with Klass.

Klass's modus operandi when dealing with opponents such as Friedman was exceptional.  He seemed to have an acute understanding of his position in both his career and his hobby and the power that position afforded him.  When he learned of Friedman's plans to move to Canada in 1980, Klass wrote a letter to A.G. McNamara with the Herzberg Institute of Astrophysics at the National Research Council in Ottawa.  For decades the NRC had been the unwilling recipient of UFO reports collected by the Royal Canadian Mounted Police.  The NRC did not research the reports they received; they merely classified them as "meteorite" or "non-meteorite" and filed them.  The purpose of Klass's letter was to bring "bad tidings"—that Stanton Friedman was moving to Canada.  Klass warned that Friedman would begin accusing them of UFO coverups.  He then went on to smear Friedman's professionalism, while simultaneously claiming to be Friedman's friend when discussing topics other than UFOs.  Ten days later a memo was sent within the NRC management which said, "I don't know what we can do to prepare for the arrival in Canada of this man Friedman, but if he acts as Klass predicts we can ill afford the publicity he will generate for us."  The decision was made quickly to turn over all UFO reports older than a year to the Public Archives of Canada.  Klass's single letter apparently prompted a major records relocation in Canada and subsequently made Friedman's research easier than it otherwise might have been.

Klass was correct in that Friedman did indeed begin studying the Canadian UFO records and did accuse the Canadian government of covering up information.  In an undated paper on the Canadian UFO situation in Canada, Friedman charged that "two government-sponsored investigative bodies" had covered up UFO information, and the government had "hidden or destroyed" further information.  In the same paper Friedman also told a different version of the events leading to the Canadian UFO records being moved to the public archives.  He claims that efforts by a "Canadian researcher" with the legal name of Mr. X and Friedman himself were responsible for having the records transferred.

Author Michael Sokolove wrote in his article "The Debunkers": "Klass was the voice of cool reason, seeking to demonstrate that a temporary inability to fill in the whole story should not open the door to wild speculation. His real argument, like all debunkers', was not with the people who believed that they had witnessed or experienced some paranormal event but with those who made an industry of igniting their imaginations."

Klass was willing to argue for his opinions wherever he perceived a challenge.  In February 1975 he called the editor of the FBI Law Enforcement Bulletin and "in strong terms laced with sarcasm he derided our publication of the article by J. Allen Hynek, 'The UFO Mystery'".  Klass accused the FBI of perpetuating a hoax in the form of extraterrestrial UFOs and referred to Hynek as a fraud.  The editor explained to Klass that at no point did Hynek say that UFOs were extraterrestrial in origin, and that UFOs present a unique problem for law enforcement as they are often the first people called when a UFO is spotted.  The editor also defended Hynek as a "widely respected scientist... affiliated with a leading university", to which Klass replied, "He won't be for long!"  Klass followed up with a letter to the LEB offering a rebuttal article, but the offer was declined.

In 1987, Klass first saw the Majestic 12 documents.  These were a set of documents "discovered" by ufologist Bill Moore and his associate, television producer Jaime Shandera.  The documents appeared to prove a government cover-up of an alien crash at Roswell, New Mexico, in 1947.  Klass immediately doubted the authenticity of the documents and set about trying to prove his suspicions.  Klass was able to raise numerous questions about each document, but after several months he realized that only the government was in a position to debunk them.  In late 1987 Klass wrote to the FBI to inform them that Moore was distributing what appeared to be top secret documents.  This prompted a lengthy investigation, but definitive proof was never forthcoming from that investigation.  In the end the consensus sided with Klass, with Friedman being the only central figure in the controversy to maintain the documents' authenticity.  Klass did find then-classified documents that failed to mention anything about aliens.

In Gary Posner's 1999 interview, Klass explained his views on UFOs: "As I turn 80, my fondest hope is that a genuine ET craft will land on our back patio and that I will be abducted. Hopefully, with the ETs' advanced technology and knowledge, they will be able to cure my spinal and walking problems and the damage to my vocal cord. Of course, I would have to pay Stanton Friedman $10,000—based on my long-standing wager that UFOs will never be proven real—but I would expect to become wealthy from the royalties of a new book titled Why Me, ET? And instead of spending many hours each week 'debunking' UFOs, I'll finally have time to watch some TV, go to the movies, and perhaps get to read a few non-UFO books for enjoyment."

The $10,000 offer
In 1966, Klass made an offer that stood for the remaining thirty-nine years of his life. By 1974, the offer had changed slightly, to the following form:
 Klass agrees to pay to the second party the sum of $10,000 within thirty days after any of the following occur:
 (A) Any crashed spacecraft, or major piece of a spacecraft is found to be clearly of extraterrestrial origin by the United States National Academy of Sciences, or
 (B) The National Academy of Sciences announces that it has examined other evidence which conclusively proves that Earth has been visited by extraterrestrial spacecraft in the 20th century, or
 (C) A bona fide extraterrestrial visitor, born on a celestial body other than the Earth, appears live before the General Assembly of the United Nations or on a national television program.
 The party accepting this offer pays Klass $100 per year, for a maximum of ten years, each year none of these things occur.

Klass made this offer openly to anyone. The offer was specifically declined by Frank Edwards, John G. Fuller, J. Allen Hynek, and James Harder, some of whom were the most vocal promoters of the extraterrestrial hypothesis. One person entered into the agreement with Klass. A man in Seattle, Washington, accepted the terms in 1969 and made two annual payments of $100. Then in 1971 he wrongly claimed the prize. When it was pointed out that his claim didn't meet any of the conditions, the man let the agreement lapse. In his book UFOs Explained, Klass offered to refund the full purchase price to every reader of the book if any of the conditions of his "UFO challenge" were ever met.

In another challenge, Klass claimed lexicographic inconsistencies based on the use of Pica typeface in the Cutler/Twining memo and offered $100 to Stanton Friedman for each legitimate example of the use of the same style and size Pica type as used in the memo. Friedman provided 14 examples and was paid $1,000 by Klass.

The UFO curse
Klass left this statement, originally published in Moseley's newsletter Saucer Smear on October 10, 1983.

Awards
In 1994 the Committee for Skeptical Inquiry (CSI) presented Klass with their Distinguished Skeptic Award.

In April 2011 CSI honored Klass again.  At a meeting of the executive council of the Committee in Denver, Colorado, Klass was selected for inclusion in CSI's Pantheon of Skeptics.  The Pantheon of Skeptics was created by CSI to remember the legacy of deceased fellows of CSI and their contributions to the cause of scientific skepticism.

Eponymous awards

The Philip J. Klass Award for Lifetime Achievement 

Aviation Week holds an annual ceremony at which they present an award named for Klass.  The Philip J. Klass Award for Lifetime Achievement cuts across all categories and criteria. The winner might be a scientist, pilot, engineer, technology specialist, business or industry leader—someone whose accomplishments will be the products of a long and varied career of service, creativity, and vision, and who has achieved widespread professional recognition and respect.  The award was first presented in 1995, and recipients have included:
  1995 Albert Lee Ueltschi, founder, FlightSafety International
 1996 Richard H. Frost, test pilot
 1997 Capt. E. B. Jeppesen, aviation pioneer
 1998 Scott Crossfield, test pilot, and John Young, astronaut
 1999 Paul MacCready, founder, AeroVironment
 2000 Edmund F. Ball, CEO, Ball Corporation
 2001 Jean-Luc Lagardère, CEO, Lagardère Group
 2002 Leonard Greene, inventor of the Aircraft Stall Warning Device, and Noel W. Hinners, NASA
 2003 Fitzhugh L. Fulton, U.S. Air Force/NASA and Civilian Test Pilot
 2004 Keith Ferris, Aviation Artist, and A. P. J. Abdul Kalam, former President of India
 2005 Assad Kotaite, President of the Council of the International Civil Aviation Organization, and William R. (Bob) Laidlaw, founder, Aerotest
 2006 Patty Wagstaff, acrobatic flying champion
 2007 Edward C. Stone, former director, JPL
 2008 Mauricio Botelho, chairman, Embraer
 2009 Hon. Alan Stephenson Boyd, United States Secretary of Transportation
 2010 Richard W. Taylor, Boeing designer and test pilot
 2011 Thomas J. Cassidy, Jr., General Atomics Aeronautical Systems, and Abraham Karem, founder, Karem Aircraft, Inc.
 2012 Pete Rustan, former Director for Mission Support, National Reconnaissance Office
 2013 C. Don Bateman, Chief Engineer, Corporate Fellow, Flight Safety Systems, Honeywell, and inventor of the Ground Proximity Warning System
 2014 Harold Rosen, electrical engineer, known as the father the geostationary satellite
 2015 John Leahy, COO – Customers, Airbus, and David Thompson, Chairman & CEO, Orbital Sciences Corporation
 2016 Charles Elachi, former director of Jet Propulsion Laboratory and vice president of California Institute of Technology
 2017 Charles Bolden, USMC aviator, and NASA astronaut, 12th NASA administrator, and John Tracy, retired chief technologist at Boeing
 2018 Bruce N. Whitman , president of FlightSafety International, director Smithsonian National Air and Space Museum

The Philip J. Klass Award 
Each year the National Capital Area Skeptics in Silver Spring, Maryland, presents the Philip J. Klass Award "for outstanding contributions in critical thinking and scientific understanding."  Recipients have included:
 2006 Michael Shermer, editor, Skeptic Magazine
 2007 James Randi, founder, James Randi Educational Foundation
 2008 Robert Park, emeritus professor of physics, University of Maryland
 2009 Paul Kurtz, founder, Prometheus Books and Committee for Skeptical Inquiry
 2010 Ray Hyman, founder, Skeptic's Toolbox
 2011 Joel Achenbach, author and writer for The Washington Post
 2012 Penn & Teller, entertainers and illusionists
 2013 Phil Plait, astronomer, lecturer, and author
 2014 Steven Salzberg, computer scientist, and bioinformatics expert
 2016 John Mather, astrophysicist, cosmologist, and Nobel Laureate in physics

Death
Klass died of cancer in Cocoa, Florida, on August 9, 2005, after moving to Merritt Island, Florida, in 2003.

Works
Books
 UFOs – Identified, 1968, Random House, 
 Secret Sentries in Space, 1971, Random House,  (about spy satellites)
 UFOs Explained, 1974, Random House, hardback  Vintage Books paperback, 
 UFOs: The Public Deceived, 1983, Prometheus, 
 UFO Abductions: A Dangerous Game, 1989, Prometheus, 
 The Real Roswell Crashed-saucer Coverup, 1997, Prometheus, 
 Bringing UFOs Down to Earth, 1997, Prometheus,  (for ages 9–12)

Articles
 
 
  Reprinted in Paranormal Borderlands of Science.
  Reprinted in Paranormal Borderlands of Science.
 
  Reprinted in The UFO Invasion and The Hundredth Monkey: And Other Paradigms of the Paranormal.
 
  Reprinted in The UFO Invasion.
  Reprinted in The UFO Invasion.
  Reprinted in The UFO Invasion and The Hundredth Monkey: And Other Paradigms of the Paranormal.
  Reprinted in The UFO Invasion.
  Reprinted in The UFO Invasion.
  Reprinted in The UFO Invasion and The Hundredth Monkey: And Other Paradigms of the Paranormal.
  Reprinted in The UFO Invasion.
  Reprinted in The UFO Invasion.
  Reprinted in The UFO Invasion.
  Reprinted in The UFO Invasion.

References

External links

 The Philip J. Klass Collection at the American Philosophical Society
 Articles by Philip Klass at CSICOP (Committee for Skeptical Inquiry)
 Archive of The Skeptics UFO Newsletter from 1989 to 2003 on the Committee for Skeptical Inquiry website.
 Historical Documents from the Philip Klass collection of Robert Sheaffer
  with Klass and Kevin Randle
 Politicking and Paradigm Shifting: James E. McDonald and the UFO Case Study, Paul E. McCarthy
 Phil Klass vs. The "UFO Promoters" – A 1981 critique of Klass by ufologist Jerome Clark

1919 births
2005 deaths
American skeptics
American UFO writers
Ufologists
UFO skeptics
Philip J. Klass $10,000 offer
Writers from Des Moines, Iowa
General Electric people
Deaths from cancer in Florida
Fellow Members of the IEEE
20th-century American engineers
American magazine editors
20th-century American non-fiction writers
People from Merritt Island, Florida